is a Japanese jidaigeki or period drama that was broadcast in 1979. It aired on Nippon Golden Network as The Fierce Battles of Edo. This drama was inspired by Akira Kurosawa's 1954 film Seven Samurai and produced by the same film company. The lead stars are Keiju Kobayashi and Shigeru Tsuyuguchi.

Plot 
Hanasaki (Kobayashi) and Kemanai (Tsuyuguchi) are Yoriki of Edo machi-bugyō. One day, bugyō orders them to establish an unofficial battle group of ronin to protect Edo city from villains. The battle group is called Edo no Yougekitai. Ronin receive 5 kobans from Edo machi-bugyō as a reward for each battle.

Cast 

Hanasaki: Keiju Kobayashi
Kemanai: Shigeru Tsuyuguchi
Machi: Yosuke Natsuki
Eto: Takeo Chii
Taki: Toshio Shiba
Katakura: Kōichi Miura
Sakai: Tonppei Hidari
Shima: Taeko Hattori

References

1979 Japanese television series debuts
1970s drama television series
Jidaigeki television series